HMS Volage was a  sixth-rate post-ship of the Royal Navy.  She served during the Napoleonic War, capturing four privateers and participating in the Battle of Lissa (1811). She was sold in 1818. Her new owners renamed her Rochester and she served in a commercial capacity for another 12 years, first sailing between England and India, and then making two voyages to the South Seas as a whaler. She was last listed in Lloyd's List in 1831.

Naval career
Volage was built by Richard Chapman, of Bideford, who launched her on 23 March 1807. She sailed to the Mediterranean in October 1807, soon after commissioning in May 1807 under Captain Philip Rosenhagen. On 6 November she was off Galita Island when she captured the French cutter Succès, of ten guns and 59 men, under the command of lieutenant de vaisseau Bourdé Villehuet. According to her captain, Succès had sailed from Toulon three days earlier on a cruise; Rosenhagen suspected that she was actually carrying despatches that Villehuet had had time to destroy. Rosenhagen also thought that Succès may have been in British service as the Sussex.

The next year, on 28 July 1808, Volage captured the French brig  just north of Corsica after a chase of nine hours during which Requin threw her boats, boom, and anchors overboard. Requin was only 14 months old, armed with 16 guns, though pierced for 18, and had a crew of 108 men under the command of capitaine de fregate Bérard, a Member of the Legion of Honour. She had just left Ajaccio where she had delivered prizes that she had taken on her way from Algiers to Toulon. Rosenhagen took his prisoners into Malta before returning to his station. A French account reports that Requin endured two-and-a-half hours of fire, returning three broadsides, before surrendering to the English frigate Volage, of 40 guns.

Earlier, in May,  had chased and engaged Requin for some 88 hours and 369 miles before having to give up the chase when Requin was able to gain the protection of the guns of Fort Goleta in the bay of Tunis. The British took Requin into service as HMS Sabine.

Almost a year later, Volage captured two more privateers. On 6 September 1809 she captured Annunciate, of two guns and 40 men. Then on 20 September, Volage captured Jason, of six guns and 69 men.

There they destroyed 25 vessels carrying stores and provisions for Joachim Murat's army in Sicily.

In 1810 Captain Phipps Hornby took command and she served in the Adriatic, fighting at the Battle of Lissa and driving off a much larger French ship during the action. The action cost Volage 13 men killed and 33 wounded. Volage was badly cut-up in the battle. She carried with her Lord Byron as a passenger.

In 1847 the Admiralty awarded all surviving claimants from the action the Naval General Service Medal with clasp "Lissa".

Following this victory, Volage came briefly under the command of Arthur Bingham in February 1812, or so. She then was sent to the East Indies under Captain Donald Hugh Mackay. She was carrying Sir Evan Nepean, who was taking up his post as governor in Bombay, and escorting three cartel ships. On the way she arrived at the Cape of Good Hope on 24 June. She then served under the orders of Sir Samuel Hood in the Eastern Archipelago and the China seas. In June 1813, Volage was under the command of Captain Samuel Leslie when her sailors took part in the capture of the pirate settlement at Sambas, in Borneo. There they helped capture five batteries, one after another, in half an hour. In September Volage participated  in the operations in support of the restoration of the Sultan of Palembang. Leslie left Volage on 1 January 1814. Then for while she came under the command of her first lieutenant (acting captain) John Allen.

In March Volage next came under the command of Captain Joseph Drury, followed by Captain Charles Biddulph in April. However he died in April 1815. In February 1816 she came under the command of Captain Johnathan Bartholomew Hoar Curran, who sailed her back to Britain.

Disposal: Volage was sold on 29 January 1818 for £1,600 to a Mr. Lackland for mercantile use. She then assumed the name Rochester.

Mercantile career
Rochester first appears in Lloyd's Register (LR) in 1818, but much of the entry is illegible. The 1819 issue showed Rochester, "Bdefrd"-built, 10 years old, and 530 tons (bm). The data in the tables below comes from both LR and the Register of Shipping (RS). The discrepancies between these sources comes from the facts that they published at different points in the year, and that they were only as accurate as owners chose to keep them. The lack of attention to keeping the registers updated means the information in the registers is often not consistent with other data sources.

In 1813 the EIC had lost its monopoly on the trade between India and Britain. British ships were then free to sail to India or the Indian Ocean under a license from the EIC. A list of licensed ships showed Rochester, D. Sutton, master, sailing from England on 14 April 1818, bound for Bengal.

Hills & Co., or A. Hill next deployed Rochester to the Southern Whale Fishery. She made two voyages as a whaler.

Captain Charles B. Worth sailed from London on 8 February 1823, bound for Peru. The voyage was eventful in that she visited Tonga, Bay of Islands, Rotuma, the waters off Japan, the coast of California, and Honolulu. Eight men deserted at Rotuma, and she lost two boats and five men off California. During the voyage captain Worth died of an infection after his knee came into contact with the sharp edge of a barb on a harpoon. Captain Clunie returned to England on 1 February 1827 with more than 1800 barrels of whale oil.

Captain Folger sailed from England on 17 November 1827, bound for the Seychelles. Rochester was a reported to have been at Honolulu in January 1829. Captain Smith returned to England on 19 September 1830 with 780 casks (330 tuns) of whale oil. This was reported at the time to have been the largest cargo of whale oil ever landed by an English whaler.

Notes, citations, and references

Notes

Citations

References
Brenton, Edward Pelham (1837) The naval history of Great Britain, from the year MDCCLXXXIII. to MDCCCXXXVI. (H. Colburn).

External links

 Ships of the Old Navy

 

1807 ships
Laurel-class post ships